Argyroploce chlorosaris is a species of moth in the family Tortricidae first described by Edward Meyrick in 1914. This species is endemic to New Zealand. The classification of this moth within the genus Argyroploce is regarded as unsatisfactory and in need of revision. As such this species is currently also known as Argyroploce (s.l.) chlorosaris.

References 

Sterrhinae
Moths described in 1914
Moths of New Zealand
Endemic fauna of New Zealand
Taxa named by Edward Meyrick
Endemic moths of New Zealand